In six-dimensional geometry, a truncated 6-orthoplex is a convex uniform 6-polytope, being a truncation of the regular 6-orthoplex.

There are 5 degrees of truncation for the 6-orthoplex. Vertices of the truncated 6-orthoplex are located as pairs on the edge of the 6-orthoplex. Vertices of the bitruncated 6-orthoplex are located on the triangular faces of the 6-orthoplex. Vertices of the tritruncated 6-orthoplex are located inside the tetrahedral cells of the 6-orthoplex.

Truncated 6-orthoplex

Alternate names
 Truncated hexacross
 Truncated hexacontatetrapeton (Acronym: tag) (Jonathan Bowers)

Construction 

There are two Coxeter groups associated with the truncated hexacross, one with the C6 or [4,3,3,3,3] Coxeter group, and a lower symmetry with the D6 or [33,1,1] Coxeter group.

Coordinates 
Cartesian coordinates for the vertices of a truncated 6-orthoplex, centered at the origin, are all 120 vertices are sign (4) and coordinate (30) permutations of
 (±2,±1,0,0,0,0)

Images

Bitruncated 6-orthoplex

Alternate names
 Bitruncated hexacross
 Bitruncated hexacontatetrapeton (Acronym: botag) (Jonathan Bowers)

Images

Related polytopes

These polytopes are a part of a set of 63 uniform 6-polytopes generated from the B6 Coxeter plane, including the regular 6-cube or 6-orthoplex.

Notes

References
 H.S.M. Coxeter: 
 H.S.M. Coxeter, Regular Polytopes, 3rd Edition, Dover New York, 1973 
 Kaleidoscopes: Selected Writings of H.S.M. Coxeter, edited by F. Arthur Sherk, Peter McMullen, Anthony C. Thompson, Asia Ivic Weiss, Wiley-Interscience Publication, 1995,  
 (Paper 22) H.S.M. Coxeter, Regular and Semi Regular Polytopes I, [Math. Zeit. 46 (1940) 380-407, MR 2,10]
 (Paper 23) H.S.M. Coxeter, Regular and Semi-Regular Polytopes II, [Math. Zeit. 188 (1985) 559-591]
 (Paper 24) H.S.M. Coxeter, Regular and Semi-Regular Polytopes III, [Math. Zeit. 200 (1988) 3-45]
 Norman Johnson Uniform Polytopes, Manuscript (1991)
 N.W. Johnson: The Theory of Uniform Polytopes and Honeycombs, Ph.D. 
  x3x3o3o3o4o - tag, o3x3x3o3o4o - botag

External links 
 Polytopes of Various Dimensions
 Multi-dimensional Glossary

6-polytopes